Carl Folkes (born 13 February 1968) is a Canadian sprinter. He competed in the men's 4 × 400 metres relay at the 1988 Summer Olympics.

References

External links
 

1968 births
Living people
Athletes (track and field) at the 1988 Summer Olympics
Canadian male sprinters
Olympic track and field athletes of Canada
Black Canadian track and field athletes
Jamaican emigrants to Canada
People from Saint Catherine Parish